The Norwegian Cyber Defence Force is a branch of the Norwegian Armed Forces responsible for military communications and defensive cyberwarfare in Norway. The force employs 1,500 people located at more than 60 locations. The main base is at Jørstadmoen in Lillehammer, with a secondary base at Kolsås outside Oslo. The Cyber Defence was established as its own branch on 18 September 2012.

See also
 List of cyber warfare forces

References

Cyberwarfare
Military of Norway
Lillehammer
Organisations based in Oppland
2012 establishments in Norway
Computer security organizations
Military units and formations established in 2012